A Westmeath County Council election was held in County Westmeath in Ireland on 24 May 2019 as part of that year's local elections. All 20 councillors were elected for a five-year term of office from 4 local electoral areas (LEAs) by single transferable vote. The 2018 LEA boundary review committee replaced the three LEAs used in the 2014 elections.

Results by party

Fianna Fáil gained one seat in this election, Fine Gael and the Labour Party retained their five and two seats respectively, the Green Party had its first ever two local councillors in Westmeath elected, Sinn Féin lost their representation on this council while there were two Independent candidates elected. The smaller parties that ran candidates in Westmeath (Aontú, the Social Democrats and Renua) failed to make any breakthrough.

Results by local electoral area

Athlone

Kinnegad

Moate

Mullingar

Results by gender

Footnotes

Sources

References

2019 Irish local elections
2019